William McClellan Chapin (December 28, 1943 – December 2, 2016) was an American  child actor, known for a considerable number of screen and TV performances from 1943 to 1959 and best remembered for both his roles as the "diaper manager" Christie Cooper in the 1953 family feature The Kid from Left Field and little John Harper in Charles Laughton's 1955 film noir movie The Night of the Hunter.

Chapin was the brother of former child actors Lauren Chapin, known as Kathy "Kitten" Anderson from the TV series Father Knows Best and of Michael Chapin, another child performer of the 1940s and 1950s.

Life and career
Born William McClellan Chapin on December 28, 1943, in Los Angeles, he was the second of three children of Roy Chapin, a bank manager, and Marquerite Alice Barringer, who later became a kind of personal coach for all of her children's acting careers. His sister Lauren later told about alcohol problems and sexual abuse in the troubled family.

Early roles and Broadway
When only a few weeks old, Chapin made his screen debut in the uncredited role of "Baby Girl" in 1944's Casanova Brown, starring Gary Cooper. Five months later he had another uncredited baby role in Marriage Is a Private Affair, starring Lana Turner. He had another bit role in The Cockeyed Miracle in 1946. He started acting professionally in 1951 in a  supporting role in the Broadway stage musical Three Wishes for Jamie, which, while passably successful, toured the West Coast in the summer of the same year. After essential changes regarding dramatization of the play and replacements in the original West Coast cast, when the play moved to New York City in early 1952, it finally became a considerable success and earned him the N.Y. Drama Critics Award as the most promising young actor of the year.

From The Kid from Left Field to A Man Called Peter
This stage success might have earned him his role as the grandson in the 1952 TV adaption of Paul Osborn's 1938 Broadway play, On Borrowed Time at the Celanese Theatre, but his first real screen role he landed just one year later as the "Diaper Manager" Christie Cooper, the lead role of the 1953 family release The Kid from Left Field, starring Dan Dailey, Anne Bancroft and Lloyd Bridges.

He then did three successive episodes of Jack Webb's Dragnet and two other television shows before he portrayed Brian "Gadge" Robertson, the bright grandson of a fictive astroscientist in the science fiction B-flick Tobor the Great, 1954.

Two smaller screen appearances then fell into line, one in a film noir, entitled Naked Alibi, 1954, with Sterling Hayden and Gloria Grahame and another bit role in the famous screen musical There's No Business Like Show Business, again starring Dan Dailey with Donald O'Connor and Marilyn Monroe, before the boy gained his next memorable screen attentions as the young son of historic clergyman Peter Marshall in A Man Called Peter and Victor Mature's screen son in his second film noir: Violent Saturday, both of which were released in 1955.
In between he continued to appear in standard television series such as  Waterfront, The Millionaire, Cheyenne, and My Friend Flicka, and various TV theaters, anthologies and dramas.

The Night of the Hunter

When Charles Laughton personally cast Billy Chapin for the role of young John Harper in his 1955 film classic The Night of the Hunter, the boy was already considered an "acting technician" among the child performers of his time. After a private meeting with Billy in his Hollywood home, Laughton told Davis Grubb, the author of the original story: "What I want is a flexible child, and the boy is exactly that." Later, Laughton publicly offered praise especially for "...the strength of [Chapin's] innate ability to understand the construction of a scene, its impact and its importance."
Vintage sources claimed that Laughton might find it difficult to direct Chapin, as well as Sally Jane Bruce, who played his younger sister (Pearl Harper), but contemporary sources and rediscovered archival material from the production of The Night of the Hunter  prove that, aside from a few intergenerational tiffs, the old man and the boy got along wonderfully, even if, according to these sources, Robert Mitchum, who played the bogus preacher Harry Powell, in fact took over some directing tasks.

Though now considered a classic, The Night of the Hunter was a critical and commercial failure when released, "because of its lack of the proper trappings."
The film was an inductee in the 1992 National Film Registry list.

Tension at Table Rock and career on TV
Chapin's final big screen appearance came just a year after The Night of the Hunter, as young Jody Burrows in the 1956 B-Western Tension at Table Rock, starring Richard Egan. From then on his film career declined until he was acting solely on television, where his career eventually ended late in 1959 in an episode of the long-running family series Fury (1955–60).

Personal life and death
In her own biography, Chapin's sister Lauren describes Chapin as having had alcohol and drug problems in his twenties and thirties. Billy Chapin served in the United States Marines, achieved a college education and went into private industry. He married and had three children. In his later years, he was plagued by health problems.

Chapin died December 2, 2016, after a long illness, twenty-six days away from his 73rd birthday. He died of lung cancer while suffering from dementia, having previously had a stroke.

Work

Filmography (in order of release)

On the stage

Television (in order of airing)

References

External links
 
 
 Billy Chapin at BFI - Film and TV Database
 Official homepage of his sister Lauren 

1943 births
2016 deaths
American male child actors
American male film actors
American male television actors
20th-century American male actors
Male actors from Los Angeles
United States Marines